Pitangueiras is a municipality in the state of Paraná in Brazil. The population is 3,262 (2020 est.) in an area of 123 km². The elevation is 660 m.

References

Municipalities in Paraná